The 1946 Paris–Tours was the 40th edition of the Paris–Tours cycle race and was held on 12 May 1946. The race started in Paris and finished in Tours. The race was won by Briek Schotte.

General classification

References

1946 in French sport
1946
May 1946 sports events in Europe